Wilkinson House is a historic home located in Pocopson Township, Chester County, Pennsylvania. The house was built about 1884, and is a two-story, five bay, frame dwelling with German siding in a Rural Gothic style.  It has a full basement and attic and a cross gable roof.  It features a three bay front porch with decorative scrollwork.

It was added to the National Register of Historic Places in 1985.

References

Houses on the National Register of Historic Places in Pennsylvania
Gothic Revival architecture in Pennsylvania
Houses completed in 1884
Houses in Chester County, Pennsylvania
National Register of Historic Places in Chester County, Pennsylvania